Ghazaros (Lazarus) Saryan (30 September 1920 – 27 May 1998) was an Armenian composer and educator.

Life and career
Ghazaros Saryan was born into a family of distinguished Armenian artists. He is the son of renowned painter Martiros Saryan and the grandson of the prominent writer Ghazaros Aghayan. Musically gifted, Ghazaros attended the Yerevan State Conservatory from 1934 to 1938, where he studied composition with Sargis Barkhudaryan and Vardges Talyan. Afterwards, he travelled to Moscow and enrolled in the composition class of Vissarion Shebalin at the Gnessin State Musical College.

With the outbreak of World War II in 1941, Ghazaros was drafted into the Soviet army and served actively until 1945. Subsequently, he entered the Moscow Conservatory. Among his composition teachers were Dmitri Kabalevsky, Dmitri Shostakovich and Anatoly Nikolayevich Alexandrov. Saryan graduated in 1950.

Upon his return to Armenia, Saryan joined the faculty of the Yerevan Komitas State Conservatory where he taught orchestration. During 1955–56, he was chairman of the Armenian Composers' Union. In 1960, he was appointed rector of the Conservatory, a position he retained until 1986. Saryan taught composition as well, training such Armenian composers as Tigran Mansurian, Rober Altunyan, Vardan Adjemyan and Ruben Sargsyan.
 
Ghazaros Saryan was essentially a composer of symphonic oeuvre. He also wrote works for chamber music, as well as several film scores.

Saryan received many awards, including the People's Artist of the Armenian SSR (1983) and the People's Artist of the USSR (1991). For his military service he was decorated with the Red Star Medal.

Saryan's Armenia: Symphonic Panels was performed in 1991 at the Pierre Boulez Contemporary Music Center in Metz, France, and his Passacaglia was presented in 1995 during the Athens Music Festival.

Ghazaros Saryan's manuscripts are deposited at the Martiros Saryan Museum, in Yerevan, Armenia.

Compositions

Orchestra
Symphonic Poem, 1950                                                                                                   	
Symphonic Images, 1956
Հանդիսավոր նախերգանք [Festive Overture], 1957
Adagio and Dance, string orch, 1957
Serenade, 1959
Armenia: Symphonic Panels on motifs by Martiros Saryan, 1966
Vn Concerto, 1972
Symphony, 1980
Choreographic Composition, 1987
Passacaglia, 1994
Fanfares, 1996
Andante and Presto, vn, chm orch, 1997

Vocal
Սովետական Հայաստան [Soviet Armenia], vocal soloists and chorus, 1950
Երգ խաղաղության [Peace Song], voice, pf, 1951
Խաղաղության օրը [Day of Peace] (vocal-symphonic suite), chorus and orch, 1953
Քեզ եմ երգում, Հայրենիք [Fatherland, I Am Singing of You], voice, pf, 1955

Instrumental
Theme with Variations, pf, 1947
Sonata no. 1, vc, pf, 1948
String Quartet no. 1, 1949
Dance, pf, 1955
Concert Piece, trp, pf, 1962
Aria and Toccata, vn, pf, 1966
Պապիկի ժամացույցը [Grandfather's Clock], pf, 1970
String Quartet no. 2, 1986
Sonata no. 2, vc, pf, 1989
3 Postludes, pf, 1990

Romances
Ինչու՞ ուշացար [Why Are You Late?], 1956
Հինգ քնարական երգեր [Five Lyrical Songs], 1960

Film Scores
Փեսատես [Visiting the Groom], 1953
Մանրունք [Small Change], 1954
Հովազաձորի գերիները [The Captives of Hovazadzor], 1956
Առաջին սիրո երգը [The Song of First Love] (composed with Arno Babadjanian), 1958
01-99, 1959
Նրա երազանքը [Her Fantasy], 1959
Մեր թաղի ձայները [The Voices of Our Neighborhood], 1960
Մարտիրոս Սարյան [Martiros Saryan], 1965
Արևային գույների մեղեդին [Melodies of Sunshine], 1979

References

Further reading
Արաքսի Սարյան, Ղազարոս Սարյանը եվ նրա ժամանակը, Аракси Сарьян, Лазарь Сарьян и Его Время. «Արճեշ» հրատարակչություն, Yerevan 2001.

Recordings
http://cdbaby.com/cd/lazarsaryan (Chamber Music)
http://cdbaby.com/cd/lazarsaryan2 (Symphonic Music)

External links
Lazar Saryan at the Armenian National Music website

1920 births
1998 deaths
Musicians from Rostov-on-Don
Armenian composers
Soviet composers
Soviet male composers
People's Artists of the USSR
People's Artists of Armenia
Russian people of Armenian descent
Komitas State Conservatory of Yerevan alumni
Gnessin State Musical College alumni
Moscow Conservatory alumni
Academic staff of the Komitas State Conservatory of Yerevan
Armenian people of World War II
Soviet military personnel of World War II
20th-century classical musicians